We Are Family, previously the Party of Citizens of Slovakia, is a right-wing populist political movement in Slovakia led by Boris Kollár known for its populism and opposition to immigration. The positions of the party to European Union are soft eurosceptic but it is for in favor of a status quo. The party rejects the federalization of European Union and also LGBT rights. We Are Family is popular mainly at the national level and less at the local level. Vice-presidents of party are Minister of labour Milan Krajniak, parliamentary deputies Petra Krištúfková and Peter Pčolinský (who is also the chairman of the parliamentary group of the party).

History
The party was founded on 10 November 2015 by businessman Boris Kollár by renaming and repurposing an existing minor party named Our Land (Náš Kraj). The party took 6.6% of the vote in the 2016 parliamentary election, winning 11 seats in the National Council. In February 2019, the party joined the Identity and Democracy Party.

Election results

National Council

European Parliament

Presidential

References

Nationalist parties in Slovakia
Conservative parties in Slovakia
2015 establishments in Slovakia
Political parties established in 2015
Right-wing populist parties
Member parties of the Identity and Democracy Party
Right-wing politics in Slovakia
Right-wing parties in Europe